Sphenacodontidae (Greek: "wedge point tooth family") is an extinct family of small to large, advanced, carnivorous, Late Pennsylvanian to  middle Permian pelycosaurs.  The most recent one, Dimetrodon angelensis, is from the late Kungurian or early Roadian San Angelo Formation. However, given the notorious incompleteness of the fossil record, a recent study concluded that the Sphenacodontidae may have become extinct as recently as the early Capitanian. Primitive forms were generally small (60 cm to 1 meter), but during the later part of the early Permian these animals grew progressively larger (up to 3 meters or more), to become the top predators of their environments. Sphenacodontid fossils are so far known only from North America and Europe.

Characteristics

The skull is long, deep and narrow, an adaptation for strong jaw muscles.  The front teeth are large and dagger-like, whereas the teeth in the sides and rear of the jaw are much smaller (hence the name of the well-known genus Dimetrodon – "two-measure tooth", although all members of the family have this attribute).

Several large (~3 meters) and advanced members of this group (Ctenospondylus, Sphenacodon, Secodontosaurus and Dimetrodon) are distinguished by a tall sail along the back, made up of elongated vertebral neural spines, which in life must have been covered with skin and blood vessels, and presumably functioned as a thermoregulatory device.  However, possession of a  sail does not appear to have been essential for these animals.  For example, there is the case in which one genus (Sphenacodon – fossils known from New Mexico) lacks a sail, while a very similar and closely related genus (Dimetrodon – fossils known from Texas) has one.  During the Permian, these two regions were separated by a narrow sea-way, but it is not clear why one geographically isolated group should evolve a sail, but the other group not.

Classification

The family Sphenacodontidae is actually paraphyletic as originally described, defined by shared primitive synapsid characters; these animals constitute an evolutionary gradation from primitive synapsid to early therapsid.  The clade Sphenacodontia is used to designate the monophyletic group that includes sphenacodontids and all their descendants (including mammals), while Sphenacodontidae in the strict sense includes only specialised pelycosaurs, and not earlier more primitive members of the family like Haptodus, Palaeohatteria, Pantelosaurus, and Cutleria (in pre-cladistic classifications all included under the genus Haptodus). The clade Sphenacodontoidea is used by Laurin and Reisz 1997 to designate the most recent common ancestor of Sphenacodontidae and Therapsida and all their descendants, and is defined by certain features of the skull.

See also
 Evolution of mammals

References

 Carroll, R. L. (1988), Vertebrate Paleontology and Evolution, WH Freeman & Co.
 Colbert, E. H., (1969), Evolution of the Vertebrates, John Wiley & Sons Inc (2nd ed.)
 Laurin, M. and Reisz, R. R., 1997, Autapomorphies of the main clades of synapsids 
 Reisz, R. R., 1986, Handbuch der Paläoherpetologie – Encyclopedia of Paleoherpetology, Part 17A Pelycosauria  Verlag Dr. Friedrich Pfeil,  
 Romer, A. S., (1947, revised ed. 1966) Vertebrate Paleontology, University of Chicago Press, Chicago
 Romer, A. S. and Price, L. I., (1940), Review of the Pelycosauria, Geological Society of America Special Papers, No 28

External links
 Synapsida: Sphenacodontia
 Deuterostoma/Chordata/Synapsida/Pelycosauria/Sphenacodontidae.htm Sphenacodontidae - list of species

 
Prehistoric synapsid families
Pennsylvanian first appearances
Guadalupian extinctions
Taxa named by Othniel Charles Marsh